Elghammar is a house in Södermanland County, Sweden. Initially owned by the Kruse family of Elghammar, then by Johan Adolf Welander, the existing manor house was sold in 1807 to Marshall Curt von Stedingk, who ordered new constructions in the French Empire style.

His son died in 1875 and the property was inherited by a daughter, who married the 5th Duke of Otrante (the duke had as an ancestor Joseph Fouché, who was the French Minister of Police during the reign of Emperor Napoleon). The castle—or manor/Italian villa as the owner, the Duchess Christina d'Otrante, prefers it to be perceived—is surrounded by forests and a farm.

References

Buildings and structures in Södermanland County